Apostle of Mercy may refer to:
 blessed Michał Sopoćko
 saint Faustina Kowalska
 Józef Andrasz
 Apostoł Miłosierdzia Bożego, a quarterly edited by the Pallottines